Bonnie Falls, also called Scappoose Falls is a small waterfall located in Columbia County, in the U.S. state of Oregon. The waterfall is known for a fish ladder that bypasses the waterfall to assist fish navigate the waterfall.

Bonnie Falls is located off of Highway 30, west of the small town of Scappoose.

See also 
 List of waterfalls in Oregon

References 

Waterfalls of Oregon
Parks in Columbia County, Oregon